Joseph Henry Hamilton Jr. (January 6, 1929 – June 9, 1991) was an American television producer and actor.

Career
Hamilton began his career as a singer and composer with a vocal group, The Skylarks. With The Skylarks, he appeared on many early television programs, including Dinah Shore's.  He became the producer of The Garry Moore Show in 1958, where actress Carol Burnett was a regular. He also appeared in two 1964 episodes of The New Phil Silvers Show. 

Hamilton appeared in several episodes of The Andy Griffith Show as a bystander who made fun of Deputy Barney Fife (Don Knotts). He worked with Burnett on the short-lived CBS variety show The Entertainers and her long-running eponymous series, The Carol Burnett Show, as executive producer and composer of its theme song. After Burnett's show concluded, he was executive producer of the 1979 Eunice TV movie. He also served as executive producer of The Tim Conway Show in 1980-81. 

Hamilton was a catalyst behind the creation of Mama's Family . Despite the character of Thelma "Mama" Harper's death in the movie, the show centered around Mama, and ran for 30 episodes on NBC (from 1982 to 1984), and subsequently for 100 more episodes in syndicated version, produced independently for Lorimar Telepictures (from 1986 to 1990). He made one brief appearance (albeit on a poster) on the show as Duke Reeves.

Hamilton won five Emmy Awards, the first for The Garry Moore Show, which featured Burnett.

Hamilton also wrote Burnett's famous theme song, which she sang to end her show each week, “I'm So Glad We Had This Time Together”.

Personal life

Hamilton was the brother of television actress Kipp Hamilton.

Hamilton’s first marriage (April 10, 19481963), to Gloria Hartley, produced eight children. 

He married Carol Burnett on May 4, 1963. They had three children, including Carrie Hamilton, before divorcing in 1984. He married Sandy Troggio in 1991, before dying of cancer that same year on June 9.

He is buried in Holy Cross Cemetery.

Actor 
 Sea Hunt (1960) - Season 2, Episode 5

References

External links

American television producers
American male composers
Burials at Holy Cross Cemetery, Culver City
Deaths from cancer in California
1929 births
1991 deaths
20th-century American male actors
20th-century American composers
20th-century American businesspeople
20th-century American male musicians